The 2022 New Orleans Breakers season was the first season for the New Orleans Breakers as a professional American football franchise. They play as charter members of the United States Football League, one of eight teams to compete in the league for the 2022 season. The Breakers technically play as a traveling team (since the entirety of the regular season will be played at Protective Stadium and Legion Field in Birmingham, Alabama) and are led by head coach Larry Fedora.

Offseason

Draft

The 2022 USFL draft was conducted entirely on social media. Draft selections by the Michigan Panthers were announced on their social media. The Breakers selected NFL journeyman Kyle Sloter in the first round.

Supplemental draft

Personnel

Final roster

The Breakers, like all other teams, have a 38-man active roster with a 7-man practice squad.

Staff

Schedule
The Breakers' 2022 schedule was announced on March 7. They opened the season against the Philadelphia Stars.

Note: Intra-division opponents are in bold text. * mean that they host the game, since all eight teams play at the same stadium

Game summaries

Week 1: vs. Philadelphia Stars

The Breakers started their season against the Philadelphia Stars. The Breakers put the first points on the board with a pick-6 by Vontae Diggs, putting the Breakers up 7-0. In the second quarter, the Breakers blocked a punt in the endzone for a safety, putting the Breakers up 9-0.  In the waning minutes of the second quarter, the Stars drove 94 yards downfield, where the Breakers defense committed 20 penalty yards, and scored, putting the Breakers at a 9-7 lead. 

In the third quarter, a Kyle Sloter pass was intercepted by the Stars, which set them up with a 38 yard field goal to put the Breakers down 9-10. Halfway into the third, the Breakers took the lead again with a 58 yard touchdown drive and a 2 point conversion, putting the Breakers up 17-10. The Stars responded in the fourth with a 2 play 50 yard drive which included a 42 yard rush, to tie it up 17-17. The Breakers responded on their next drive with a 9 play 63 yard drive, putting the Breakers up 23-17, which would be the final score as both teams traded possessions for the rest of the fourth.

Week 2: at Tampa Bay Bandits

The Breakers faced division rival Tampa Bay Bandits. The Breakers struck first on a 79 yard touchdown drive, but the extra point was missed, putting the Breakers at 6-0. After a Bandits punt, the Breakers marched 65 yards downfield to score another touchdown, converting a 2-point conversion to bring the Breakers to 14-0. The Bandits responded in the second quarter with a 69 yard field goal drive capped off by a 21-yard field goal by Tyler Rausa to bring the Breakers at 14-3. The Breakers responded with a 56 yard touchdown drive that included a 29-yard one-handed catch by wide receiver Johnathan Adams, deemed the catch of the season, to put the Breakers up 21-3.

In the second half, the Bandits turned it over on downs while the Breakers were unable to score. In the fourth quarter, the Breakers stretched their lead to 24-3 after a 22 yard field goal. They triumphed more, scoring a touchdown off a Ta'amu interception, putting them at a commanding 31-3 margin. They then made a 30-yard field goal to put them at 34-3 with a little over a minute, which would be the final score.

Week 3: vs. Birmingham Stallions

The 2-0 Breakers played against division rival, the 2–0 Birmingham Stallions. In what started off as a slow offensive performance for both sides, the Stallions got a 7-0 lead on a J'Mar Smith screen pass to Marlon Williams. Later into the 2nd quarter, the Breakers scored on a 10 yard pass from Kyle Sloter to Johnnie Dixon which made the Stallions lead trim down to 7-6. With 7 seconds left in the half, Brandon Aubrey made a 33-yard field goal to give Birmingham a 10-6 lead at the half. 

Coming out of the half, the Breakers conducted an 8:50 17 play drive to regain the lead at 13-10 on an 11 yard pass from Sloter to Dixon. This would be the last time the Breakers would score all game. Birmingham would score 12 points in the final quarter of play. A touchdown from Smith to Victor Bolden Jr, a safety forced by Dondrea Tillman, and a Brandon Aubrey field goal. Birmingham would end up winning 22-13. The loss put the Breakers at 2nd in the South Division.

Standings

Postseason

References

New Orleans
2022 in sports in Louisiana
New Orleans Breakers (2022)